Surcamps is a commune located in the Somme department, Hauts-de-France, northern France.

Geography

Population

Places of interest
 The nineteenth century church
 Traces of Gallo-Roman settlements
 The wood of Coroy, where the well-preserved remains of a Nazi V1 rocket launch site is situated. Built by French prisoners in the summer of 1943, it was bombed 12 times by the Allies from December 1943 until April 1944.

See also
Communes of the Somme department

References

Communes of Somme (department)